Dancing Madly Sideways is the fourth studio album by the British-based American musician Marcella Detroit, released in July 2001.

Background 
Detroit explains the title and concept of Dancing Madly Sideways as being "How I see the world; going crazy. Not progressing, not going back, just going sideways". The non-traditional electronic sound of the record stemmed from Detroit "wanting to do something more experimental". The album was released for free download through numerous MP3 websites and as a mail-order exclusive physical release from Detroit's website. It is the first Detroit album released y her independent label Banned Records, which was later renamed Lofi Records. Preceding the album's release, two releases were made available for purchase: a CD single of "Lust for Like" and a three-track sampler EP, Limited Edition.

Critical reception 

Aaron Badgley from Allmusic gave the album a positive review, writing, "Here [Detroit] is able to assemble a tight band and produce a brilliant, angry, aggressive, exciting dance/rock album. Detroit's vocals are strong, as is her outstanding guitar playing. Fast, tasteful, and tuneful solos complete the mix and contribute to the originality of the music."

Track listing

References 

2001 albums
Marcella Detroit albums